John Wallace White (January 19, 1878 – September 30, 1963) was a Major League Baseball outfielder who played for one season. He played for the Boston Beaneaters for one game on June 26 during the 1904 Boston Beaneaters season.

External links

1878 births
1963 deaths
Major League Baseball outfielders
Baseball players from Indiana
Boston Beaneaters players
Jacksonville Jacks players
Quincy Browns players
Quincy Ravens players
Indianapolis Hoosiers (minor league) players
Indianapolis Indians players
Milwaukee Brewers (minor league) players
Milwaukee Creams players
Burlington Colts players
Toronto Canucks players
Buffalo Bisons (minor league) players
Columbus Buckeyes (minor league) players
Columbus Senators players
Grand Rapids Furnituremakers players
Syracuse Stars (minor league baseball) players
Cleveland Lake Shores players
Toronto Maple Leafs (International League) players